Abercromby Square is a square in the University of Liverpool, England. It is bordered by Oxford Street to the north and Cambridge Street to the south. It is named after General Sir Ralph Abercromby, commander of the British Army in Egypt, who died of his wounds following the Battle of Alexandria in 1801.

Abercromby Square Gardens occupy the centre of the square.

See also
 Architecture of Liverpool

External links

 The Building of Abercromby Square By Adrian R Allan: Unit of Liverpool 1986 Hq 942.753 ALL

Buildings and structures in Liverpool
Parks and commons in Liverpool
Squares in Liverpool